A transmission solenoid or cylinoid is an electro-hydraulic valve that controls fluid flow into and throughout an automatic transmission. Solenoids can be normally open or normally closed. They operate via a voltage or current supplied by the transmission computer or controller. Transmission solenoids are usually installed in a transmission valve body, transmission control unit, or transmission control module.

Types 
Variable force solenoid
On-off solenoid
Pulse-width modulated solenoid
Low leak variable bleed solenoid

Manufacturers
American Axle
ZF
TREMEC
BorgWarner
Eaton
Bosch
Hilite Industries
Saturn Engineering and Electronics
TLX Technologies

References

 

Automotive transmission technologies
Valves